Glenelly Valley or simply Glenelly (from the ) is the longest valley in the Sperrin Mountains in County Tyrone, Northern Ireland. It lies within the Sperrin Area of Outstanding Natural Beauty (AONB) and is also in an Environmentally Sensitive Area (ESA). 

In the year 858AD, Aed Finnliath mac Néill, king of Ailech, heavily defeated a large Viking army inland at Glenn Foichle (Glenelly, in the barony of Upper Strabane). They may have come from Lough Neagh and the Bann.

Irish Language
Glenelly was home to some of the last native Irish speakers in County Tyrone. The dialect was studied by Gearóid Stockman and Heinrich Wagner who noted that "Glenelly Irish is closer to Donegal Irish than the other Tyrone dialects". Their findings were published in Lochlann, volume 3, in 1965.

References

Landforms of County Tyrone
Valleys of Northern Ireland